Ian Allison may refer to:

Ian Allison (basketball) (1909–1990), Scottish born Canadian basketball player
Ian Allison (scientist), Australian glaciologist and climate scientist